Lynette Gai Cook (born 4 May 1959) is an Australian former cricketer. Cook played for the ACT women's cricket team between 1982 and 1990. Cook played two One Day Internationals for the Australia national women's cricket team.

References

External links
 Lynette Cook at southernstars.org.au

Living people
1959 births
Australia women One Day International cricketers